Unified Folk Theory  is the first studio album released by American folk rock/Americana band The Giving Tree Band, released on December 4, 2007, on Crooked Creek Records. In line with their environmental stewardship, the CD's were manufactured at Earthology Records and the band pledged to plant 10 trees for every 1000 Cd's sold. The album takes its name from the physics concept of the unified field theory.

Track listing

Disc 1

Disc 2

Personnel 
 Bob Salihar – vocals, acoustic guitar, dobro, harmonica
 E Fink – vocals, upright bass, fret-less acoustic bass, dulcimer, piano, penny whistle, ukulele, tambura, Tibetan chime
 Todd Fink – vocals, acoustic guitar, classical guitar, banjitar, tambourine
 Pat Burke – vocals, acoustic guitar, dobro, mandolin, cello
Additional personnel
 E Fink – engineering, mixing engineer, producer, mastering engineer
 Elisabeth Blair – vocals – "Don't Say Goodbye", "That Don't Make It Easier"
 Sheela Chandrasekhara – vocals – "Oh My Mind"
 Ana Klimiuk – Artwork, Layout, and Design

References

External links
 

2007 debut albums
The Giving Tree Band albums